Parasakthi is a 1952 Indian Tamil-language drama film directed by Krishnan–Panju and written by M. Karunanidhi. The film stars V. C. Ganesan, S. V. Sahasranamam, S. S. Rajendran, Sriranjani Jr., and Pandari Bai. It is the cinematic acting debut of Ganesan and Rajendran. Based on Pavalar Balasundaram's play of the same name, Parasakthi narrates the misfortunes that befall the members of a Tamil family during World War II.

Central Studios initially planned on creating a film based on the Parasakthi play and T. S. Natarajan's play En Thangai; however, the idea was dropped after Natarajan objected. The film rights of Parasakthi were later bought by P. A. Perumal of National Pictures, with the patronage of A. V. Meiyappan. The soundtrack was composed by R. Sudarsanam, cinematography was handled by S. Maruti Rao, and Panju edited the film under the alias "Panjabi". Filming began in mid-1950, but took over two years to complete

Parasakthi was released on 17 October 1952, during the festive occasion of Diwali, and faced controversies because of its portrayal of Brahmins and Hindu customs and practices in a negative light. The elitarian society including the then ruling State government even demanded the film to be banned. Despite these protests, the film was praised for its dialogues and the actors' performances, and became a commercial success with a theatrical run of over 175 days. Parasakthi acquired cult status in Tamil cinema and became a trendsetter for dialogues and acting for later Tamil films.

Plot 
Chandrasekaran, Gnanasekaran and Gunasekaran are three Indian immigrant brothers living in Rangoon, Burma with Chandrasekaran's wife Saraswati. Their younger sister Kalyani was raised in their home town Madurai, Tamil Nadu by their father Manickampillai. In 1942, during World War II, the three brothers and Saraswati plan to visit Madurai to attend the impending wedding of Kalyani to a writer named Thangappan. Due to war conditions and bombardment of Burmese ports by Japan, the shipping company offers only one ticket; Gunasekaran, the youngest brother, takes it and leaves for Tamil Nadu. The ship fails to reach on time due to the dangers of the war, and Kalyani's marriage takes place without any of her brothers present.

Kalyani becomes pregnant. But on the day she delivers her child, Thangappan dies in an accident and Manickampillai dies of shock, leaving Kalyani and her child destitute. Her house gets auctioned off, and she makes her living by selling food on the streets. Gunasekaran, after being stranded at sea for several months, finally arrives in Tamil Nadu at Madras. However, while watching a dance performance, he is robbed of all his belongings after being intoxicated. Impoverished, he becomes enraged at the status of the once glorious Tamil Nadu, and fakes insanity by indulging in numerous tricks to make a living. Gunasekaran finally comes across his destitute sister at Madurai, having learned of their father's death and her poverty. He continues to play insane and does not reveal his true identity to her due to his poverty, but hovers around her. Kalyani is irritated by the stranger's behaviour, unaware that he is her brother.

Kalyani is nearly molested by a vagabond named Venu, but is saved by Gunasekaran. She later leaves Madurai and arrives at Tiruchi, where she obtains work as a maid of blackmarketeer Narayana Pillai, who also tries to molest her. She is saved by his wife, and leaves the job. While searching for his sister, Gunasekaran reaches Tiruchi and comes across Vimala, a wealthy woman, to whom he explains the miserable status of him and his sister in the society. After resting in her house for a while, he silently leaves to continue searching for Kalyani.

As Japanese shelling intensifies in Burma, Chandrasekaran and Gnanasekaran decide to return to India. Chandrasekaran, accompanied by Saraswati, reaches Tiruchi safely and becomes a judge, but Gnanasekaran is lost in the journey and loses a leg in the shelling before arriving in India. He begs for a living, forms an association for beggars and tries to reform them. Kalyani reaches Chandrasekaran's palatial house seeking food, but Chandrasekaran throws her out without recognising her. She later arrives at a temple seeking help, but the pujari also tries to molest her. Frustrated with life and unable to feed her child, Kalyani throws it into a river and attempts suicide, but is soon arrested for killing the child and brought for trial.

At the court, Kalyani defends her act of infanticide with the judge being Chandrasekaran, who after hearing her story realises she is his sister, and faints. Gunasekaran is also brought to the court for having attacked the pujari who tried to molest his sister. During his trial, Gunasekaran explains the misfortunes which have befallen him and his family, and justifies his actions. Gunasekaran's valiant defence in the court awakens everyone on the ills of the society. As the trial proceeds, Vimala arrives and produces Kalyani's child, which was revealed to have safely fallen in her boat instead of the river. Kalyani and Gunasekaran are pardoned and acquitted by the court, and reunite with Chandrasekaran. Gnanasekaran, while collecting donations for his association of beggars, also joins them unexpectedly. With Vimala and Gunasekaran deciding to get married, the family subsequently inaugurates a welfare home for orphans.

Cast 

Male cast
 Sivaji Ganesan as Gunasekaran
 S. V. Sahasranamam as Chandrasekaran
 S. S. Rajendran as Gnanasekaran
 Duraisami as Manikkam Pillai
 T. K. Ramachandran as Venu
 K. M. Nambirajan as Vellai Sami
 Venkatraman as Thangappan
 V. K. Ramasamy as Narayana Pillai
 K. P. Kamakshi as the pujari
 M. N. Krishnan as Kuppan
 Sakthivel as the Servant
 D. V. Narayanasami as Thambidurai
 V. K. Karthikeyan as Tamil Pandit

Female cast
 Sriranjani as Kalyani
 Pandari Bai as Vimala
 Susheela as Saraswathi
 Kannamma as Jolly
 Angamuthu as the fruit seller
 Muthulakshmi as Kantha
 A. S. Jaya as Parvathi
Dance
 Kumari Kamala
 Kusalakumari

Additionally, Kannadasan makes an uncredited appearance as a judge.

Production

Development 
Parasakthi was a popular 1950s Tamil play written by Pavalar Balasundaram, a Tamil scholar. Around the same time, En Thangai (My Sister), written by T. S. Natarajan, became popular. Sivaji Ganesan, at that time a struggling stage actor, acted in En Thangai as "a brother sacrificing his love for the sake of his sightless kid sister." The pre-production crew at Central Studios, Coimbatore, initially planned to merge these two plays to make a film. However, Natarajan disagreed with the idea, and sold the rights of the play to another producer. En Thangai was made into a film with the same name.

Later, film distributor P. A. Perumal of National Pictures, with the patronage of A. V. Meiyappan of AVM Productions, bought the film rights of Parasakthi. The duo Krishnan–Panju were signed on to direct at Meiyappan's suggestion, and M. Karunanidhi, who would later become the Chief Minister of Tamil Nadu, was signed to write the script. The cinematography was handled by S. Maruti Rao, while the songs were choreographed by Heeralal. Panju edited the film under the alias "Panjabi".

Casting and filming 
Ganesan, the stage actor of En Thangai was chosen to play the male lead, making his cinematic acting debut. Perumal cast Ganesan after being impressed with his performance as Nur Jahan in the Sakthi Nadaga Sabha play of the same name. It was he who, in 1950, gave Ganesan a flight ticket to Madras for the screen test for Parasakthi. Ganesan had simultaneously shot for the Telugu-Tamil bilingual film Paradesi / Poongothai, which was supposed to be his actual film to release first, but released much later after Perumal requested its co-producer Anjali Devi to let Parasakthi release first. Ganesan had earlier dubbed for actor Mukkamala in the 1951 Tamil film Niraparadhi.

Parasakthi did not begin well for Ganesan. When shooting began and 2000 feet of the film was shot, Meiyappan was dissatisfied with Ganesan's "thin" physique, and wanted him replaced with K. R. Ramasamy. Perumal refused, and Ganesan was retained. Meiyappan was also satisfied with the final results of the film. The initial scenes of Ganesan which he earlier disliked were reshot. Karunanidhi later recalled that Ramasamy was unable to accept the film due to other commitments. Ganesan was paid a monthly salary of 250 (about US$52.5 in 1952) for acting in the film. S. S. Rajendran, another successful stage artist, also debuted in Parasakthi after the advice of politician C. N. Annadurai. According to historian Film News Anandan, Parasakthi was one of the few films at that time to be "completely driven" by stage artists.

Rajasulochana was initially cast as the female lead, but opted out due to her pregnancy, and was eventually replaced by Sriranjani Jr. Pandari Bai was added to the film, after Meiyappan was impressed with her performance in Raja Vikrama (1950). Poet Kannadasan declined to work as one of the film's lyricists, and instead acted in a minor role as a judge, as he was "determined to take part in the Parasakthi movie". A portrait of lawyer P. Theagaraya Chetty was used to portray the father-in-law of S. V. Sahasranamam's character Chandrasekaran. The film's climax song "Ellorum Vazha Vendum" featured stock footage of the politicians C. Rajagopalachari, E. V. Ramasamy, M. Bhaktavatsalam, Annadurai, and Karunanidhi. Although Ganesan began working on the film in mid-1950, it took over two years to complete.

Themes 

Panju stated that Parasakthi was designed to "create havoc. Of course, it did. We were challenging the social law itself, the basic Constitution itself". The title song of the film was composed by Bharathidasan, keeping with the demand of the DMK party seeking a sovereign Dravidian nation. The poem glorifies the utopian nature of the Dravidian nation and ends with a long monologue that grieves the present India's reality. When the female lead Kalyani becomes pregnant, she and her husband Thangappan decide to name the child "Pannirselvam" if it is a boy, and "Nagammai" if it is a girl. The names are references to A. T. Pannirselvam, a prominent and respected leader of the Justice Party and Nagammai, a leading activist in the Self-Respect Movement and the wife of E. V. Ramasamy. According to film historian Selvaraj Velayutham, Parasakthi was basically oriented to social reform. United News of India (UNI), Malini Nair of The Times of India and K. S. Sivakumaran of the Sri Lankan newspaper Daily News have referred to the film as a satire, with UNI describing it as a "sociological satire".

The film deploys Kalyani's vulnerability as a widow in a hostile society, with consequent threats to her chastity, especially during the court trial scenes. The name Kalyani was chosen by the screenwriter to emphasise the contradiction between the meaning of her name indicating auspiciousness and her contrasting penury. The theme is expressed through Gunasekaran's arguments in the court : "[My] sister's name is Kalyani. An auspicious name [indeed]. But there is no mangalyam around [her] neck". Also, Vimala, who becomes Gunasekaran's bride, compares herself to Kannagi, a popular symbol of chastity in Tamil culture. Ganesan, who enacted the role of Gunasekaran in Parasakthi, was a DMK activist in real life in 1952 and helped in propagating the theme of Dravida Nadu. The film attempted to bring to light the alleged fraud in the name of religion and presented agnostic views, displaying a powerful critique of the Congress rule in the Madras Presidency. Film historian Mohan Raman compared Parasakthi to Velaikari (1949), as both films featured a "court scene where the hero rids society of irrational beliefs and practices".

Music 
The music of Parasakthi was composed by R. Sudarsanam. The lyrics were written by Bharathidasan, Subramania Bharati, M. Karunanidhi, Annal Thango, Udumalai Narayana Kavi and K. P. Kamatchisundaram. The background score was composed by the Chennai-based Saraswathi Stores Orchestra. Relatively higher importance was given to the film's dialogues over its music, so the dialogues were sold separately on audio cassettes. Some of the numbers from Parasakthi were based on songs from Hindi films; one was a rehash from the Urdu film Akeli (1952). The number "O Rasikkum Seemane" inspired "Itai Tazhukikkolla" from Periyar (2007). The 2010 film Rasikkum Seemane borrows its title from the song of the same name. A cryptic reference 'Annave' appears in the number "Kaa Kaa Kaa", in the line "Kaakai Annave neengal azhagaana vaayaal pannaga paadureenga", which translates to "Crow elder, you are singing so melodiously with your beautiful mouth". It was written by Narayana Kavi. "Poomalai" is based on the Urdu song "Sanwariya, Tohe Koi Pukare" from the Pakistani film Dupatta (1952). An album containing remixed versions of the songs of Parasakthi was released in on 3 June 2009, to commemorate Karunanidhi's 86th birthday.

Release 
[[File:Sivaji Parasakthi.jpg|thumbnail|245px|right|Sivaji Ganesan in Parasakthi '''s climactic court scene]]Parasakthi was released on 17 October 1952, on Diwali day. It was regarded as a "propaganda vehicle for a new political party" and marked the start of cinema's "starring role in Tamil politics". Ganesan's performance in the film's court scene was also very well received by audience, and was considered to have propelled him to stardom. The film became an instant commercial success, running for over 175 days in several theatres, and was one of the first films to be screened at the Madurai-based Thangam theatre, which was noted as Asia's largest theatre at the time. It ran for over 50 days in all the 62 centres it was released, and at the Sri Lanka-based Mailan Theatre, it ran for nearly 40 weeks. Parasakthis Telugu-dubbed version of the same name was released on 11 January 1957.

 Reception Parasakthi received critical acclaim. P. Balasubramania Mudaliar of Sunday Observer wrote, "The story is simple but it has been made powerful by Mr. Karunanidhi by his beautiful dialogues. Mr. Shivaji Ganesan, who plays the main role dominates from the beginning to the end" and concluded, "If an Academy award were to be given to any picture, I have little doubt that this picture would be entitled on its merits to such an award." Dinamani Kadir, a Tamil weekly owned by Indian Express Limited (then known as The Indian Express Group), carried an unusually long review of Parasakthi running into three closely printed pages. The review was given a cynical title, "Kandarva Mandalam" ("The Abode of Kandarvas") and it began with a small box-item which read, "Parasakthi: This goddess is abused in a Tamil film with her name". The reviewer opined, "The main aim of the film is to attach gods. Along with that, the government and society are overtly and covertly attacked. The embittered and agitated reviewer further claimed, "He [the hero of the film], acting as a mad man, threatens and beats the people on the street and grabs whatever they have and eats it. Then he goes to give repeatedly all those economics lectures, rationalist lectures and anti-god lectures. When we see the hero doing all that, it seems as if he is portraying the lives of those who are trying to force such ideas in the ...film." For the reviewer, thus, the DMK men were living on others' sweat and preaching unacceptable subversive ideas. The magazine Sivaji praised the dialogues by Karunanidhi, and the performances of Ganesan and Sahasranamam.

 Controversies 
Post release, Parasakthi was marred by numerous controversies, and was defined as "one of the most controversial films in the history of Tamil cinema" by historian S. Theodore Baskaran. It was accused of trying to portray Brahmins in poor light. Abuse of Hindu customs and religious practices evoked strong protests from the Hindu orthodoxy. Scenes like a priest attempting to rape a woman in a temple were found to be very provocative. The social elite and members of the then ruling Congress party demanded the film to be banned. The-then Chief Minister of Madras, C. Rajagopalachari was unhappy with the extremely provocative nature of the film, but allowed it to be screened. One of the reasons stated by them was the dialogue spoken by Ganesan's character, "Just because you came around chanting names and offered flowers to the stone, would it become a god?", which was accused of "mocking the audiences." His reference to Goddess Parasakthi as a stone created a stir, and the word "stone" was eventually censored from the soundtrack. However, the given message was still "clear and the impact viral." The State Government requested the Union Government to reconsider the film certification, but they declined, due to a previous examination by a Madras intelligence officer, who stated:

 Legacy Parasakthi acquired cult status and changed the character of Tamil cinema. Dialogue writing was given more importance than ever before. Speeches of the film replaced traditional music of artists like M. S. Subbulakshmi, K. B. Sundarambal and others at festivities. The film also had its share in giving the DMK the necessary stimulus to overthrow the Congress party in Tamil Nadu. The dialogues became so popular that "roadside entertainers used to recite long passages from the film in market area of Madras and collect money from bystanders", and memorising the film's dialogues became a "must for aspirant political orators". They were even released separately on gramophone records.

K. Hariharan, the director of L. V. Prasad Film Academy in Chennai, included the film in his 2013 list, "Movies that stirred, moved & shook us". According to Film News Anandan, after Parasakthi, Ganesan "became the dominant icon of the DMK", replacing K. R. Ramasamy. Historian S. Muthiah said that Parasakthi "showed Karunanidhi as the master of meaningful screen dialogue that carried forceful messages to the masses". In 2017, Kamal Haasan included the film in his list of 70 favourite movies, stating "This film changed the texture of society. A star was born – the ease with which Sivaji Ganesan walked through the film! His peers paled into insignificance. The writer was Karunanidhi. It was a film about social anger. I saw it much later; I understood it only then."

In celebration of the film's 50th year, Ganesan's autobiography, entitled Enathu Suya Sarithai was released on 1 October 2002 in Tamil, exactly a year after the actor's death in 2001. The English version, titled Autobiography of an Actor: Sivaji Ganesan, October 1928-July 2001, was released exactly five years later in 2007. To commemorate 50 years since the release of Parasakthi, a memorial was inaugurated in AVM Studios on 17 October 2002 by Kamal Haasan in the presence of Ganesan's sons Prabhu and Ramkumar. The memorial stands at the same place where Ganesan first faced the camera. A slab of black granite, the memorial has on its top a brass medallion that bears a close-up of Ganesan uttering his popular opening line "Success". At its bottom is a rectangular plaque that gives details about the memorial's inauguration. At the base of the rectangular plaque are two other plaques resembling the pages of an open book and contains the names of the technical crew and all those involved in the making of the film. The visage of Ganesan wearing a hat was designed by Thota Tharani. The 2003 film Success, starring Ganesan's grandson Dushyanth Ramkumar, was named after Ganesan's popular line.Parasakthi is included with other Ganesan films in Yettavathu Ulaga Athisayam Sivaji  (Sivaji, the Eighth Wonder of the World), a compilation DVD featuring Ganesan's "iconic performances in the form of scenes, songs and stunts" which was released in May 2012. During the film's diamond jubilee year celebrations in January 2013, K. Chandrasekaran, then the president of Nadigar Thilagam Sivaji Social Welfare Association said, "Six decades down the line Parasakthi is remembered because it is not just a film, but an epic". On the centenary of Indian cinema in April 2013, Forbes India included Ganesan's performance in the film in its list, "25 Greatest Acting Performances of Indian Cinema". Actor Sivakumar stated, "You can’t reproduce movies like Parasakthi, Pasamalar, Devadas, Veerapandiya Kattabomman or Ratha Kanneer [...] By remaking such films, you are lowering yourself, while it enhances the original artists’ image."

Ganesan's in-film dialogue "Ambāḷ entak kālattilaṭā pēciṉāḷ, aṟivu keṭṭavaṉē?" ("When did the goddess ever speak, dimwit?) was parodied by Vadivelu's character in the film Ilaignar Ani (1994). Vivek parodied the film's climax in Palayathu Amman (2000). Karthi's performance in his debut film Paruthi Veeran (2007) was compared by critics with Parasakthi. Malathi Rangarajan, in her review of Citizen (2001) at The Hindu, mentioned that the court scene during the climax was reminiscent of Parasakthi's climax. In Sivaji (2007), the eponymous character (Rajinikanth) who shares his first name with Sivaji Ganesan, utters the dialogue, "Parasakthi hero da" ("The hero of Parasakthi, man") when referring to himself.

Film Heritage Foundation announced in March 2015 that they would be restoring Parasakthi along with a few other Indian films from 1931 to 1965 as a part of their restoration projects carried out in India and abroad in accordance to international parameters. The foundation, however, stated that they would not colourise any of the films as they "believe in the original repair as the way the master or the creator had seen it." In July 2016, Ganesan's other grandson Vikram Prabhu launched a production house named "First Artist" with a still of Ganesan from Parasakthi'' as part of its logo.

See also 
 Portrayal of Tamil Brahmins in popular media
 Tamil cinema and Dravidian politics

Notes

References

Bibliography

External links 
 
 

1950s Tamil-language films
1952 drama films
1952 films
Films about poverty in India
Films about rape in India
Films directed by Krishnan–Panju
Films scored by R. Sudarsanam
Films with screenplays by M. Karunanidhi
Indian black-and-white films
Indian courtroom films
Indian drama films
Indian films based on plays
Indian satirical films
Indian World War II films